Herschel H. Hobbs (1907-1995) was a Southern Baptist clergyman who served as president of the Southern Baptist Convention from 1961 to 1963. He was born in Talladega Springs, Alabama.

He chaired the committee that drafted the 1963 revision of the Baptist Faith and Message. He graduated from Howard College (later named Samford University) and then attended the Southern Baptist Theological Seminary in Louisville, Kentucky, where he earned a doctorate in 1938.

From 1949 to 1972 he served as pastor of the First Baptist Church in Oklahoma City, OK.

Hobbs was inducted into the Oklahoma Hall of Fame in 1963. He is memorialized at two places on the campus of Samford University.

References

Southern Baptist ministers
Samford University alumni
Howard College alumni
Southern Baptist Convention presidents
1907 deaths
1995 deaths
People from Talladega County, Alabama
Southern Baptist Theological Seminary alumni